Höllvikens IP (Locally called IP) is a football stadium, located in Höllviken in southern Sweden. It's owned by the municipality, and operated by FC Höllviken, BK Höllviken and Näsets FF. The stadium has 4 pitches, 2 with natural grass and 2 with artificial grass. The main pitch, with natural grass, has a capacity of about 1000 at most.

Sport in Skåne County
Sports venues in Sweden